Pyramidia (singular: pyramidion) are the capstones of ancient Egyptian pyramids.

Tips of obelisks, also called pyramidia, were not separate stones and are not included in this list.

See also 

 Benben

References

Bibliography 

 
 
 
 
 
 
 
 
 
 
 
 
 
 

Sacred rocks
Pyramidia
Egyptology